General Joseph Lawton Collins (May 1, 1896 – September 12, 1987) was a senior United States Army officer. During World War II, he served in both the Pacific and European Theaters of Operations, one of a few senior American commanders to do so. He was Chief of Staff of the United States Army during the Korean War.

Collins' elder brother, Major General James Lawton Collins, was also in the United States Army. His nephew, Brigadier General James Lawton Collins Jr. served in World War II, the Korean War and the Vietnam War. Another nephew, Michael Collins, was the command module pilot on the Apollo 11 mission in 1969 that put the first two men on the Moon and retired from the United States Air Force as a major general.

Early life and military career
Collins was born in New Orleans, Louisiana, into a large Irish Catholic family on May 1, 1896. He entered the United States Military Academy (USMA) at West Point, New York in June 1913, at the age of 17, and graduated on April 20, 1917, exactly two weeks after the American entry into World War I, and shortly before his 21st birthday. Due to the outbreak of war, the graduation was several weeks early. He graduated 35th in his class of 139. Among those he graduated alongside were Matthew Ridgway, Mark W. Clark (who shared the same birthday as Collins and, as the two youngest cadets, were both known as the "class babies"), Bryant Moore, Ernest N. Harmon, William C. McMahon, Norman Cota, Laurence B. Keiser, William W. Eagles, William Kelly Harrison Jr., and Frederick Augustus Irving. All of these men were, like Collins, destined to become general officers and later to achieve high rank in the army, with Ridgway, along with Collins, becoming Army Chiefs of Staff and Clark becoming a four-star general.

Collins was commissioned as a second lieutenant into the Infantry Branch of the United States Army and was assigned as a platoon and later company commander with the 22nd Infantry Regiment. He was promoted to first lieutenant in May 1917, and temporary captain in August. He attended the United States Army Infantry School of Arms at Fort Sill, Oklahoma and served with the regiment at various locations between 1917 and 1919. He was promoted to captain in June 1918, and to temporary major in September, and took command of the 3rd Battalion, 22nd Infantry Regiment the following month. World War I came to an end soon afterwards, on November 11, 1918. Unable to fight overseas during the war, Collins commanded the 3rd Battalion, 18th Infantry Regiment in France in June 1919, and was assistant chief of staff, as a G-3 staff officer with the American Forces in Germany from 1920–1921. During this time, Collins served in the Army of Occupation in Germany.

Between the wars
Collins married Gladys Easterbrook in 1921 and, reverting to the rank of captain in 1920, he was instructor in the department of chemistry at the USMA from 1921 to 1925. He graduated from the company officer course at the United States Army Infantry School at Fort Benning, Georgia in 1926, and from the advanced course at the United States Army Field Artillery School at Fort Sill, Oklahoma the year after. He was an instructor in weapons and tactics at the United States Army Infantry School from 1927 to 1931. It was during this time where he first encountered George C. Marshall, the future U.S. Army Chief of Staff, who was to play a significant role in Collins's future military career. Promoted to major in August 1932, he was executive officer of the 23rd Brigade in Manila, and assistant chief of staff, as a G-2 staff officer, with the Philippine Division from 1933–1934.

Collins graduated from the United States Army Industrial College in 1937, and the United States Army War College the following year. He was then an instructor at the Army War College from 1938 to 1940. He was promoted to lieutenant colonel on June 25, 1940 and, now a full colonel (having been promoted on January 15, 1941), was chief of staff of VII Corps in 1941.

World War II

By the time the United States entered World War II in December 1941, Collins had been a temporary colonel since January. On February 14, 1942 he was promoted to the one-star general officer rank of brigadier general and the two-star general officer rank of major general on May 26.

Collins was chief of staff of the Hawaiian Department from 1941 to 1942 and served as the Commanding General of the 25th Infantry Division—nicknamed the "Tropic Lightning" Division—on Oahu and in operations against the Japanese on Guadalcanal between 1942 and 1943 and on New Georgia from July to October 1943. At the time of his appointment in May 1942 he was the youngest division commander in the United States Army, aged 46. To serve as his assistant division commander, Collins specifically selected Brigadier General John R. Hodge, a decision he never came to regret as Hodge, who later became a full general, proved himself to be up to Collins's high standards.

It was during the campaign in Guadalcanal that Collins gained his nickname of "Lightning Joe", for his dash and aggression. It was also during this campaign that saw Collins awarded with the Silver Star, the citation for which reads:

Collins was later transferred to the European Theater of Operations (ETO), where he commanded the VII Corps in the Allied invasion of Normandy and on the Western Front through to the end of World War II in Europe in May 1945. Collins was chosen by Lieutenant General Omar Bradley, who had served with Collins at the Army Infantry School before the war and was then commanding the First Army in England, as a replacement for Major General Roscoe B. Woodruff, the original commander of VII Corps and one of Bradley's West Point classmates. Woodruff was senior to Collins but had no experience in amphibious operations. Collins was appointed after a brief interview with Bradley and General Dwight D. Eisenhower, the Supreme Allied Commander, about his combat experience after Collins summed up his tactical approach in the Pacific as always targeting the high ground in an attack. Bradley turned to Eisenhower, claiming that Collins "talks our language." At the age of 47, this made Collins the youngest corps commander in the United States Army. Among the units serving under Collins' command in Normandy was the veteran 82nd Airborne Division, commanded by Major General Matthew Ridgway, a fellow graduate of the West Point class of 1917.

VII Corps played a major role in the Normandy landings in June 1944 and the subsequent Battle of Normandy, including Operation Cobra. Collins was a favorite of the 21st Army Group commander, General Sir Bernard Montgomery, who after Operation Goodwood laid the path for VII Corps to break out in Operation Cobra on 27 July 1944. After Cobra was the Battle of the Falaise Pocket, which completed the destruction of the Wehrmacht in Normandy, the corps then took part in the liberation of Paris and the Allied advance from Paris to the Rhine. In early September VII Corps took approximately 25,000 prisoners during the Battle of the Mons Pocket. It later broke through the Siegfried Line and endured heavy fighting in the Battle of Hürtgen Forest. VII Corps later played a major role in the Battle of the Bulge, the largest battle on the Western Front during World War II, and finally took part in the Western Allied invasion of Germany. VII Corps is perhaps best known for the leading role it played in Operation Cobra; less well known is Collins' contribution to that plan.

One of the few senior United States commanders to fight in both Europe and the Pacific, against the Germans and Japanese respectively, Collins contrasted the nature of the enemy in the two theaters of war:

Collins was promoted to temporary three-star rank of lieutenant general in April 1945 and permanent brigadier general in June. He was very highly regarded by General Omar Bradley, Collins' superior for most of the war, and many German senior commanders believed Collins, along with Lieutenant General Troy H. Middleton, commanding the VIII Corps, to be one of the best American corps commanders on the Western Front. Bradley commented that "Had we created another ETO Army, despite his youth and lack of seniority, Collins certainly would have been named the commander." For his service during the war Collins was three times awarded the Army Distinguished Service Medal, twice awarded the Silver Star and twice the Legion of Merit.

Postwar

After the war, Collins was deputy commanding general and chief of staff of Army Ground Forces from August to December 1945. Later, he was director of information (later chief of public information) of the United States Army from 1945 to 1947. He was deputy, later Vice Chief of Staff of the United States Army from 1947 to 1949 and was promoted to temporary general and permanent major general in January 1948.

Collins was Chief of Staff of the United States Army from August 16, 1949 to August 15, 1953; as such he was the Army's senior officer throughout the Korean War. As a wartime chief of staff his primary responsibility was to ensure that adequately trained and equipped soldiers were sent to fight in Korea. He directed the Army's operation of the railroads, brought the first Special Forces group into the order of battle, and was closely associated with the development of the army's contribution to the newly established North Atlantic Treaty Organization (NATO).

Collins was representative of the United States to the Military Committee and the Standing Group of NATO from 1953 to 1954. He was special representative of the United States in Vietnam with ambassadorial rank, 1954 to 1955, and returned to his NATO assignment. He retired from active service in March 1956, after almost 40 years of military service.

General Joseph Lawton Collins died in Washington, D.C., on September 12, 1987, at the age of 91. He is buried at Arlington National Cemetery, Virginia.

Awards

Promotions

References

Bibliography
Joseph Lawton Collins (1969). War in Peacetime: The History and Lessons of Korea

External links

Joseph Lawton Collins biography  in Commanding Generals and Chiefs of Staff a publication of the United States Army Center of Military History
J. Lawton Collins Collection Finding Aids  US Army Heritage and Education Center, Carlisle, Pennsylvania
Arlington National Cemetery Biography
Conversations with General J. Lawton Collins, Combat Studies Institute report
Papers of J. Lawton Collins, Dwight D. Eisenhower Presidential Library
Papers of John J. Walsh (Aide-de-Camp to J. Lawton Collins), Dwight D. Eisenhower Presidential Library

Generals of World War II
United States Army Officers 1939–1945

|-

|-

|-

1896 births
1987 deaths
United States Army personnel of the Korean War
People from New Orleans
Military personnel from Louisiana
United States Army personnel of World War I
Burials at Arlington National Cemetery
Recipients of the Distinguished Service Medal (US Army)
Recipients of the Silver Star
Recipients of the Legion of Merit
Recipients of the Legion of Honour
Recipients of the Croix de Guerre (France)
Joint Chiefs of Staff
American people of Irish descent
United States Army Chiefs of Staff
United States Military Academy alumni
United States Army Vice Chiefs of Staff
United States Army Command and General Staff College alumni
United States Army War College alumni
United States Army generals of World War II
United States Army Infantry Branch personnel
United States Army generals
Dwight D. Eisenhower School for National Security and Resource Strategy alumni
United States Army War College faculty
United States Military Academy faculty